Sarna is a Polish surname. Notable people with the surname include:
Angelika Sarna (born 1997), Polish athlete
Jonathan Sarna (born 1955), American historian
John Sarna (1935–2021), American politician
Linda Sarna, American nursing researcher and academic
Mirosława Sarna (born 1942), Polish athlete
Nahum Sarna (1923–2005), American Bible scholar
Paweł Sarna (canoeist) (born 1984), Polish slalom canoeist
Paweł Sarna (poet) (born 1977), Polish writer and academic

See also
 

Polish-language surnames